The following is the list of squads that took place in the women's field hockey tournament at the 1980 Summer Olympics.

Austria
The following players represented Austria:

 Patricia Lorenz
 Sabine Blemenschütz
 Elisabeth Pistauer
 Andrea Kozma
 Brigitta Pecanka
 Brigitte Kindler
 Friederike Stern
 Regina Lorenz
 Eleonore Pecanka
 Ilse Stipanovsky
 Andrea Porsch
 Erika Csar
 Dorit Ganster
 Eva Cambal

Czechoslovakia
The following players represented Czechoslovakia:

 Jarmila Králíčková
 Berta Hrubá
 Iveta Šranková
 Lenka Vymazalová
 Jiřina Křížová
 Jiřina Kadlecová
 Jiřina Čermáková
 Marta Urbanová
 Květa Petříčková
 Marie Sýkorová
 Ida Hubáčková
 Milada Blažková
 Jana Lahodová
 Alena Kyselicová
 Jiřina Hájková
 Viera Podhányiová

India
The following players represented India:

 Margaret Toscano
 Sudha Chaudhry
 Gangotri Bhandari
 Rekha Mundphan
 Rupa Kumari Saini
 Varsha Soni
 Eliza Nelson
 Prema Maya Sonir
 Nazleen Madraswalla
 Selma D'Silva
 Lorraine Fernandes
 Harpreet Gill
 Balwinder Kaur Bhatia
 Nisha Sharma

Poland
The following players represented Poland:

 Małgorzata Gajewska
 Bogumiła Pajor
 Jolanta Sekulak
 Jolanta Błędowska
 Lucyna Matuszna
 Danuta Stanisławska
 Wiesława Ryłko
 Lidia Zgajewska
 Maria Kornek
 Małgorzata Lipska
 Halina Kołdras
 Lucyna Siejka
 Dorota Bielska
 Dorota Załęczna
 Michalina Plekaniec
 Jadwiga Kołdras

Soviet Union
The following players represented the Soviet Union:

 Galina Inzhuvatova
 Nelli Gorbyatkova
 Valentina Zazdravnykh
 Nadezhda Ovechkina
 Natella Krasnikova
 Natalia Bykova
 Lidiya Glubokova
 Galina Vyuzhanina
 Natalia Buzunova
 Leyla Akhmerova
 Nadezhda Filippova
 Yelena Guryeva
 Tatyana Yembakhtova
 Tatyana Shvyganova
 Alina Kham
 Lyudmila Frolova

Zimbabwe
The following players represented Zimbabwe:

 Sarah English
 Ann Grant
 Brenda Phillips
 Patricia McKillop
 Sonia Robertson
 Patricia Davies
 Maureen George
 Linda Watson
 Susan Huggett
 Gillian Cowley
 Liz Chase
 Sandra Chick
 Helen Volk
 Christine Prinsloo
 Anthea Stewart

References

1980